Totozoquean is a proposed language family of Mesoamerica, originally consisting of two well-established genetic groupings, Totonacan and Mixe–Zoque. The erstwhile isolate Chitimacha was later proposed to be a member. The closest relatives of Totozoquean may be the Huavean languages.

Correspondences
Comparative proto-Totozoquean reconstructions are proposed in Brown et al. (2011) for simple consonants and vowels. The consonant-inventory for proto-Totozoquean is similar to that reconstructed for proto-Totonacan (Arana Osnaya 1953), and the vowels are not unlike those proposed for proto-Mixe–Zoquean (Wichmann 1995). A parallel set of laryngealized but otherwise identical proto-Totozoquean vowels is reconstructed for proto-Totozoquean to account for the distribution of laryngealized vowels in the Totonac branch of the Totonacan family, though these left no known trace in proto-Mixe–Zoquean (Wichmann 1995) and there may be a more economical explanation. Vowel length is likewise an independent parameter reconstructed for proto-Totozoquean that does not seem to affect the correspondences, but in this case it is a feature inherited by both families.

Some Totozoquean lexical correspondences have also been proposed by Davletshin (2016).

Vowels
Proto-Totozoquean (pTZ) is reconstructed with seven vowel qualities, all of which occur with long, laryngealized, and long laryngealized homologues. These reduce to a three-vowel system in proto-Totonacan (pT); length and laryngealization is retained. Proto-Mixe–Zoque (pMZ) loses laryngealization and neutralizes **ɨ~ə and **ɔ~o.

Consonants
Of the three consonants which do not appear in either daughter, **ty and **ny are poorly attested, whereas **ky is robust. Proto-Mixe–Zoque loses the laterals and gutturals, and neutralizes the alveolar–palato-alveolar distinction. Proto-Totonocan loses glottal stop and **y.

See also

Macro-Mayan

References

  1953. Reconstrucción del protototonaco: Huastecos, totonacos y sus vecinos, ed. Ignacio Bernal. Revista Mexicana de Estudios Antropológicos 23:123–30.
Totozoquean. International Journal of American Linguistics 77, 323–372.
  (1995). The Relationship among the Mixe-Zoquean Languages of Mexico. Salt Lake City: University of Utah Press.

Mesoamerican languages
Indigenous languages of Central America
Proposed language families